Robert B. Wallace ( – June 3, 1928) was an American politician from New York.

Life 
Wallace was born in around 1869.

Wallace was manager of the Van Dyke Tea Company, Harlem branch. During World War I, he was an active worker in the American Red Cross and the Liberty Loan campaigns. In 1919, he was elected to the New York State Assembly as a Republican, representing the New York County 13th District. He served in the Assembly in 1920 and 1921. He later became chief clerk of the Collector of Internal Revenue for the First District.

Wallace died from pneumonia at his summer home in City Island on June 3, 1928. He had a wife named Emma and a daughter.

References

External links 

 The Political Graveyard

1860s births
1928 deaths
Politicians from Manhattan
20th-century American politicians
Republican Party members of the New York State Assembly
Deaths from pneumonia in New York City